Rex Ray (September 11, 1956 – February 9, 2015) was an American graphic designer and collage artist, based in San Francisco.

Biography 
Born as Michael Patterson on September 11, 1956, on a United States Army base in Germany, and he was raised in Colorado Springs, Colorado. He moved to San Francisco in 1981, to attend San Francisco Art Institute (SFAI) where he graduated. Early in his career he worked as a digital graphic designer for nightclubs and for music shows. He designed and performed with The Residents, as well as designed for David Bowie, among others.

He changed his name to Rex Ray in order to start anew and be free of his past.

By the early 1990s he started a professional fine art practice. Ray had been one of the first artists to use Mac computer-based technology to create his art. He had two units in the Allied Box Factory in the Mission District in San Francisco, one was his living space and the other was his art studio. He referred to his artwork "paintings" even though they were often collage-based and lacked any traditional painting techniques.

He died February 9, 2015, after a five year battle with lymphoma.

His work is in museums including the Berkeley Art Museum and Pacific Film Archive, the San Francisco Museum of Modern Art, the San Jose Museum of Art, and the Yerba Buena Center for the Arts.

Publications

References

External links 

 Video: 75 Reasons to Live: Rex Ray on Andy Warhol’s Self-Portrait (2010) from San Francisco Museum of Modern Art (SFMoMA)
 Video: How to Make a Rex Ray (2010, aired 2018) from Public Broadcasting Service (PBS)

2015 deaths
21st-century American painters
21st-century American male artists
20th-century American painters
American male painters
1956 births
Mission District, San Francisco
Artists from San Francisco
People from Colorado Springs, Colorado
Deaths from cancer in California
20th-century American male artists